Oranjemund Airport  is an airport serving Oranjemund, a town in the ǁKaras Region of Namibia. The town and airport are located near the northern bank of the Orange River, which is the border between Namibia and South Africa.

Airlines and destinations

See also
List of airports in Namibia
Transport in Namibia

References

External links
OurAirports - Oranjemund
 

Airports in Namibia
Buildings and structures in ǁKaras Region